The ringed teal (Callonetta leucophrys) is a small duck of South American forests. It is the only species of the genus Callonetta. Usually placed with the dabbling ducks (Anatinae), this species may actually be closer to shelducks and belong in the subfamily Tadorninae; its closest relative is possibly the maned duck.

Description 
The male and female remain colourful throughout the year, lacking an eclipse plumage. The drake has a rich chestnut back, pale grey flanks and a salmon-coloured breast speckled in black. A black band runs from the top of its head down to the nape. Females have an olive-brownish back with the head blotched and striated in white, with pencilled barring on a pale chest and belly. Both have a dark tail, a contrasting pale rump, and a distinctive white patch on the wing. Bills are grey and legs and feet are pink in both sexes. Pairs easily bond. Their contact calls are a cat-like mee-oowing in ducks, a lingering peewoo in drakes. Individuals typically weigh . Ringed teals also have webbed toes with long, pointed claws that specialize in allowing the birds to sit on tree branches. These specialized toes are unique, as most waterfowl cannot easily remain perched on tree branches.

The ringed teal breeds in north-west Argentina and Paraguay, also occurring in Bolivia, Brazil and Uruguay. Upon reaching sexual maturity, ringed teals form strong pair bonds. These pair bonds typically last a single breeding season, but can last for the lifetime of a pair. A pair bond begins with the male courting the female. In general, courting consists of large amounts of preening, flashing the iridescent green patches on the wings, and swimming in figure eights around the female of interest while vocalizing. Once a pair bond is solidified, mating occurs in the water. Nests are usually created out of hollow holes in tree cavities. The nests are lined with down and the female tends to be the defender of the nest. The male, however, will defend the female against other males and potential predators throughout their pair bond.  Females typically lay 6-12 eggs that are white in colour. The eggs are incubated for an average of 29 days.  Both male and female participate incubating the eggs, however, one captive study shows that the females were solely responsible for incubation. Hatched chicks are precocial. Precocial chicks are mostly developed upon hatching, have a layer of down feathers, can walk, function, and essentially feed themselves.  Although, the chicks hatch with a layer of feather down, it is not waterproof. Since the chicks spend most of their time in the water, they rub on the parents, in doing so, they gain essential oils needed for waterproofing. Both the male and female play a large role in raising and defending the chicks until they fledge at 50–55 days old. The male, however, tends to be the most invested and will often be seen following behind separated or slower chicks.  Until fledging, the chicks stay in a close group and learn quickly from their parents how to forage, swim efficiently, and avoid predators. Often, the bonded pair is able to produce two groups of offspring in one breeding season. The male will continue to care for the first group of chicks, while the female incubates the second group of eggs. The ringed teal's pair bonding behaviour makes reproduction very efficient. By the end of a breeding season it is possible for a bonded pair to have laid and hatched up to 24 offspring.

Their habitats include tropical, swampy forests and marshy clearings in well-wooded lowlands, as well as secluded pools and small streams. As a predominantly aquatic species, ringed teals eat a variety of aquatic plants and invertebrates, as well as any seeds that can be found. Ringed teals are classified as “dabblers” as opposed to “divers”. Dabblers tend to feed on plant and insect material near the surface of the water, where as divers feed on plants, invertebrates, and fish deeper under the water's surface. Although dabblers may submerge their heads and upper torso while putting their tails up in the air, also known as “up-ending”, they rarely completely submerge themselves and stay under for periods of time, such as the divers do.

Ringed teals can live up to 15 years in captivity, however, an average life span is not known for wild individuals.

Gallery

References

External links

 Ringed Teal
 rotschulterenten.de

ringed teal
Birds of Argentina
Birds of Bolivia
Birds of Paraguay
Birds of Uruguay
ringed teal
ringed teal